The Association of American Law Schools (AALS), formed in 1900, is a non-profit organization of 176 law schools in the United States. An additional 19 schools pay a fee to receive services but are not members. AALS incorporated as a 501(c)(3) non-profit educational organization in 1971. The association is a member of both the American Council on Education and the American Council of Learned Societies Its headquarters are in Washington, D.C.

History
In August 1905, a new quarterly law publication was announced in the annual meeting held in Fort Wayne, Indiana. Henry Wade Rogers, dean of Yale Law School served as the president and 25 law schools were represented.

Leadership

Erwin Chemerinsky, dean of University of California, Berkeley School of Law, became president of AALS on January 8, 2022.  The president-elect is Mark Alexander, dean of Villanova University Charles Widger School of Law, and Vincent D. Rougeau, president of the College of the Holy Cross, is the immediate past president. 

Judith Areen became executive director and chief executive officer of AALS in February 2014.  Prior to coming to AALS, Areen was on the faculty of Georgetown University Law Center where she served as dean from 1989 to 2004 and as interim dean in 2010.

Meetings

AALS hosts a number of events throughout the year. The AALS Conference on Clinical Legal Education is the association's second largest conference with the 2015 conference having approximately 700 clinicians in attendance. The conference's sessions focus on practice areas and common areas of concern for clinicians.

Involvement in the Solomon Amendment
The AALS requires its members to follow a nondiscrimination policy regarding "race, color, religion, national origin, sex, age, disability, or sexual orientation," and for member law schools to require this of any employer to which it gives access for recruitment.

The United States Armed Forces' "don't ask, don't tell" (DADT) policy was seen by the AALS as impermissible discrimination. However, the AALS excused its members from blocking access to the military since the passage of the Solomon Amendment, which denies federal funding to the parent university of a law school as well as the school itself if military recruiters are not given full campus access. However, the AALS at the time required schools to take "ameliorative" measures when allowing military recruiters on campus, including placing "warning" signs on campus when military recruiting takes place, scheduling interviews off campus away from "core" areas, "prohibit[ing] entirely the delivery of discretionary support services" to military recruiters, charging military employers who use law school resources "reasonable fees for use of law school staff, facilities and services," etc. The AALS at the time encouraged law schools to deny benefits to military recruiters that they would ordinarily provide employers, such as coffee and free parking. Specifically, the AALS wrote in a memo to all law school deans in the United States:

The AALS engaged in litigation challenging the Solomon Amendment as violative of the First Amendment (see e.g., Rumsfeld v. Forum for Academic and Institutional Rights, Inc.). In an interesting coincidence, The Judge Advocate General's School of the United States Army is a fee-paying nonmember of AALS.

Although DADT has been ended, and although President Barack Obama called upon college campuses to welcome military recruiters during his 2011 State of the Union address, some law professors have questioned why the AALS has issued no statement declaring an end to its recommendations.

See also 
 American Bar Association
 Law School Admission Council
 Law School Admission Test

References

External links
 AALS official site
 Becoming a Law Teacher

Legal organizations based in the United States
College and university associations and consortia in the United States
Law schools in the United States
Organizations established in 1900
Professional associations based in the United States
Law-related learned societies